Joseph Ciechanover  was born in Haifa to Yitzhak, a lawyer, and Bluma, an English teacher. His parents immigrated to Israel from Poland in the early 1930s and settled in Haifa. Grew up in the Hadar HaCarmel neighborhood. His younger brother is Nobel Laureate Prof. Aaron Ciechanover. In the 1950s and early 1960s, he studied at the Hebrew University of Jerusalem in three fields: education, law and business administration. In the years 1960-1968 he was a lecturer in agricultural and administrative law at the Faculty of Agriculture of the Hebrew University of Rehovot. From 1966 to 1967 he studied law at the University of California, Berkeley. In 1991 he received a Ph.D. in Philosophy and Jewish Studies from Boston University.

Ciechanover was Director General at the Ministry of Foreign Affairs of Israel. He represented Israel at the UN Gaza Flotilla Panel. He is a recipient of the French Legion of Honour award as well as the Pentagon's Medal for Distinguished Service, has served as President of Challenge Funds, Chairman of the Board of Israel Discount Bank and as a member of the Bank of Israel Advisory Committee.

He was Head of Israel's Defense Mission to the United States and Canada, and General Counsel to the Israel Ministry of Defense and Ministry of Agriculture.
In 2021 he received the Israel Prize for lifetime achievement and contribution to Society and the state.

References

Year of birth missing (living people)
Living people
Israeli diplomats
Israel Prize recipients
People from Haifa
Israeli people of Polish-Jewish descent